Carol Denise Betts (née Ensley; born February 23, 1970), known professionally as Niecy Nash-Betts, is an American actress, comedian and television host, best known for her performances on television. Her acting career began in the late 1990s, with numerous guest appearances on television shows. She garnered further recognition for her portrayal of Deputy Raineesha Williams in the comedy series Reno 911! (2003–2009, 2020–present), along with hosting the Style Network show Clean House (2003 to 2010), for which she won a Daytime Emmy Award.

Nash has also starred as Lolli Ballantine on the TV Land sitcom The Soul Man (2012–2016), Denise Hemphill in the Fox horror-comedy series, Scream Queens (2015–2016), Desna Simms, a leading character, in the TNT crime comedy-drama Claws (2017–2022), and in 2022 began starring as Special Agent Simone Clark in the ABC crime series, The Rookie: Feds. For her performance as nurse Denise "DiDi" Ortley in the HBO comedy Getting On (2013–2015), she received two Primetime Emmy Awards nominations for Outstanding Supporting Actress in a Comedy Series and a nomination for a Critics' Choice Television Award for Best Supporting Actress in a Comedy Series.

In 2014, Nash played the role of civil rights activist Richie Jean Jackson in the historical drama film Selma directed by Ava DuVernay. In 2019, she starred as Delores Wise in DuVernay's miniseries When They See Us, for which she was nominated for a Primetime Emmy Award for Outstanding Lead Actress in a Limited Series or Movie. In 2020, she portrayed feminist leader Florynce Kennedy in Mrs. America. In 2022, she starred in Dahmer – Monster: The Jeffrey Dahmer Story as Glenda Cleveland, the next door neighbor to serial killer Jeffrey Dahmer. For this performance, Nash received the Critics' Choice Television Award for Best Supporting Actress in a Movie/Miniseries and was nominated for a Golden Globe Award and a Screen Actors Guild Award.

Early life
Carol Denise Ensley was born in Palmdale, California.

She is a spokesperson for M.A.V.I.S. (Mothers Against Violence In Schools). The organization was founded by her mother after the 1993 shooting death of Nash's younger brother, Michael. M.A.V.I.S.'s mission is to inform the public of the violence children encounter on school campuses.

Nash attended California State University, Dominguez Hills.

Career

Early works
Nash made her professional acting debut in the 1995 film Boys on the Side. On television, she later guest-starred in NYPD Blue, Judging Amy, Reba, Girlfriends, CSI: Crime Scene Investigation, and ER. She also appeared in 1999 film Cookie's Fortune, and had a recurring role on the CBS drama series City of Angels in 2000.

From 2003 to 2009, Nash played the roles of Deputy Raineesha Williams and T.T. on the Comedy Central comedy series Reno 911!. She hosted Clean House on the Style Network from 2003 to 2010, as well as providing the voice of Mrs. Boots on the ABC Family animated series Slacker Cats, and starred as Rhonda, opposite Jerry O'Connell, in the short-lived Fox sitcom Do Not Disturb in 2008. She guest-starred on The Bernie Mac Show as Bernie's sister Bonita from 2003 to 2005. Nash won a Daytime Emmy in 2010 as the producer/host of Clean House: The Messiest Home in the Country in the category of Outstanding Special Class Special. On August 4, 2010, Nash announced that she was leaving Clean House, and also that the show would continue without her.

Nash appeared on the tenth season of ABC's Dancing with the Stars beginning in March 2010, where she was partnered with Louis van Amstel. On May 11, 2010, Nash and van Amstel were eliminated from the competition, taking fifth place. In 2011 she got her own reality show, Leave It To Niecy, on TLC, about her life with her new husband and stepson, but it was quickly cancelled. In that same year she was in a TLC wedding special. She also appeared in the films Code Name: The Cleaner (2007), Reno 911!: Miami (2007), Not Easily Broken (2009), G-Force (2009), and Trust Me (2013).

2012–present

In 2012, Nash began starring opposite Cedric the Entertainer in the TV Land sitcom The Soul Man, a spinoff of Hot in Cleveland. In 2013, she began starring opposite Laurie Metcalf in the HBO comedy series Getting On. She received a Primetime Emmy Award for Outstanding Supporting Actress in a Comedy Series nomination for her role on the show in 2015 and 2016, as well as a Critics' Choice Television Award for Best Supporting Actress in a Comedy Series in 2016.

In 2014, Nash played Richie Jean Jackson, the wife of Dr. Sullivan Jackson, in the historical drama film Selma, directed by Ava DuVernay. The film received acclaim from critics; on Rotten Tomatoes, the film holds a rating of 99%, based on 205 reviews, with an average rating of 8.7/10. Selma was listed on many critics' top ten lists. Also that year, Nash joined the cast of the Fox comedy series The Mindy Project in a recurring role as Dr. Jean Fishman, a rival of the title character.

From 2015 to 2016, Nash co-starred on the Fox horror-comedy series Scream Queens as a security guard, and then FBI Agent Denise Hemphill. She appeared in another Fox comedy, Brooklyn Nine-Nine, as Andre Braugher's sister. The following year, she was cast in the leading role in the Fox comedy pilot The Enforcers. The pilot was not ordered to series. She also was cast in a recurring role as Louise Bell in the Showtime period drama Masters of Sex.

In 2017, Nash was cast in a leading role in the TNT crime comedy-drama series Claws, produced by Rashida Jones, about a South Florida nail salon. Also in 2017, Nash appeared in Mary J. Blige's music video for "Strength of a Woman". For her dramatic turn in Claws, Nash has received critical praise. She received a Satellite Award for Best Actress – Television Series Musical or Comedy, as well as another nomination for the NAACP Image Award for Outstanding Actress in a Comedy Series. In August 2018, it was announced that Nash would star in and produce Naked With Niecy Nash, a late-night talk show for TNT.

In July 2018, Nash received a star on the Hollywood Walk of Fame in the television category. Later that year, Ava DuVernay cast her in the Netflix limited drama series When They See Us. For her performance she received critical praise and a nomination for Primetime Emmy Award for Outstanding Lead Actress in a Limited Series or Movie.

In 2020, Nash starred in another Netflix feature drama film, Uncorked, directed by Prentice Penny, and had a recurring role in the Netflix comedy-drama Never Have I Ever, created by Mindy Kaling. Also that year, she played civil rights advocate Florynce Kennedy in the Hulu miniseries Mrs. America. Later in 2020, Nash signed on to host her own syndicated daytime talk show for CBS Television Distribution.

During season five of The Masked Singer, Nash served as a guest host while regular series host Nick Cannon recovered from COVID-19.

In 2020, Nash reprised her role as Deputy Raineesha Williams in the seventh season of Reno 911! which aired on Quibi. She also appeared in the 2021 Paramount+ movie Reno 911! The Hunt for QAnon. The eighth season of the series, titled Reno 911! Defunded, premiered on The Roku Channel in February 2022.

On April 28, 2021, Fox announced that it had ordered a revival of Don't Forget the Lyrics with Nash as host. It eventually premiered on May 23, 2022.

Nash guest-starred on two episodes of The Rookie, titled "Simone" and "Enervo", which served as a backdoor pilot centered on her character and aired on April 24 and May 1, 2022. On May 13, 2022, the spinoff, titled The Rookie: Feds, was ordered. More recently, she signed a first-look television deal with Entertainment One.

Personal life
In 1993, Nash's brother Michael Ensley was shot and killed at the age of 17 by a 16-year-old gunman at Reseda High School in California.

Nash was married for 13 years to Don Nash, an ordained minister; they filed for divorce in June 2007. They have three children together.

In September 2010, Nash became engaged to Jay Tucker. Nash participated in a TLC reality show that followed the preparations for the wedding. On May 28, 2011, they were married at the Church Estate Vineyard in Malibu. On October 30, 2019, Nash announced her pending divorce from Tucker via Instagram. On June 21, 2020, the divorce was finalized.

On August 29, 2020, Nash married singer Jessica Betts. She has chosen not to label her sexual orientation, and doesn't view this as her coming out.

Filmography

Film

Television

Video games

Awards and nominations

References

External links

 

1970 births
20th-century American actresses
20th-century American comedians
21st-century American actresses
21st-century American comedians
Actresses from California
African-American actresses
African-American female comedians
American women comedians
American film actresses
American television actresses
American voice actresses
California State University, Dominguez Hills alumni
Comedians from California
LGBT actresses
LGBT African Americans
American LGBT actors
LGBT people from California
Living people
Participants in American reality television series
People from Compton, California
20th-century African-American women
20th-century African-American people
21st-century African-American women
21st-century African-American people
21st-century LGBT people
American LGBT comedians